In Ireland, the counties are divided into civil parishes and parishes are further divided into townlands. The following is a list of parishes in County Armagh.

See also
List of townlands in County Armagh

References

 
Armagh
Civil parishes